Isoetes muelleri is a species of quillwort, a type of lycophyte. This generally apomictic aquatic plant is native to  Australia.

Distribution and habitat
It is widespread across all the states and territories of Australia, growing in a wide range of habitats, from  subalpine tarns, lakes and slow-moving streams where it is submerged throughout the year, to ephemeral swamps, and in hot and cold to climates.

References

External links
Isoetes muelleri occurrence data from GBIF

muelleri
Flora of Australia
Taxa named by Alexander Braun